Condon Butte is a  summit in Lane County, Oregon, in the United States.

The butte was named for Thomas Condon a Congregationalist minister and professor of geology at the University of Oregon. The butte is in the Three Sisters Wilderness Area which is part of the Willamette National Forest.

References

Buttes of Oregon
Mountains of Lane County, Oregon
Mountains of Oregon